Daniel Arthur Quimby Cruz (born January 3, 1990) is an American soccer coach and former player who is currently the head coach of USL Championship club Louisville City FC.

Career

Youth and College
Cruz was born in Petersburg, Virginia. He attended junior high in Rohnert Park, California, and then moved to Glendale, Arizona, where he attended Ironwood High School, where he led his team to a 2006 State Championship. He played two years of college soccer at the University of Nevada-Las Vegas. He was the first UNLV player to earn MPSF Newcomer of the Year honors in his freshman year in 2007 and was named to the all-Mountain Pacific Sports Federation first team after scoring five goals in 2008.

During his college years he also played with Des Moines Menace in the USL Premier Development League.

Professional
Cruz was drafted in the third round (41st overall) of the 2009 MLS SuperDraft by the Houston Dynamo. He made his professional debut on March 28, 2009, coming on as a substitute in Houston's game against the San Jose Earthquakes. He scored his first goal for the Dynamo against DC United, he also had an assist in that game. In the 2011 season, Cruz was a big part of the Houston Dynamo team and scored a stunning goal at the end of the season against the Portland Timbers to help Houston get into the playoffs. He started in all four playoff games, including Houston's 1–0 loss to Los Angeles Galaxy in MLS Cup 2011.

In January 2012, Cruz was traded from Houston to D.C. United in exchange for allocation money.

On August 16, 2012, Cruz was traded to the Philadelphia Union in exchange for Lionard Pajoy and an international roster spot.

On March 19, 2015, Cruz signed a loan deal with FK Bodø/Glimt. He made his debut against Haugesund on April 30, 2015, in which Bodø/Glimt lost 1–2.

On February 15, 2017, Cruz signed with the San Francisco Deltas for their inaugural season in the NASL.

In August 2017, he joined Real Monarchs.

International
Cruz represented the United States at the FIFA U-17 World Cup in South Korea, the Pan American Games in Brazil in 2007, appeared in seven international games for the United States U-20 national team in 2008, and played in the FIFA U-20 World Cup in Egypt in 2009.

Coaching career

Real Monarchs
In February 2018, Cruz was announced as promoted to assistant coach of the Monarchs for the 2018 season, under Mark Briggs.

Louisville City FC
On April 27, 2021, after spending time as an assistant coach and technical director at Louisville City FC, Cruz was appointed as interim head coach of the club. On October 11, Cruz was officially announced to have signed a multi-year agreement as the permanent head coach for Louisville.

Personal life
Cruz made an appearance on MTV's show Made, helping Michael Schwenke turn from "theater geek" into a soccer player on February 7, 2011.

Career statistics

Club

References

External links
 

1990 births
Living people
Association football wingers
American soccer players
American expatriate soccer players
UNLV Rebels men's soccer players
Des Moines Menace players
Houston Dynamo FC players
D.C. United players
Philadelphia Union players
FK Bodø/Glimt players
Minnesota United FC (2010–2016) players
San Francisco Deltas players
Real Monarchs players
Sportspeople from Glendale, Arizona
Sportspeople from Petersburg, Virginia
Soccer players from Richmond, Virginia
Footballers at the 2007 Pan American Games
USL League Two players
Major League Soccer players
Eliteserien players
North American Soccer League players
United States men's youth international soccer players
United States men's under-20 international soccer players
Houston Dynamo FC draft picks
Expatriate footballers in Norway
American expatriate sportspeople in Norway
2009 CONCACAF U-20 Championship players
Pan American Games competitors for the United States